Monts Telliers are a mountain with twin peaks in the Pennine Alps of Switzerland. It is relatively easy to reach from the Swiss side of the ascent towards the Great St. Bernard Pass, especially by ski tours in winter-early spring, but also on foot during the summer. It offers a great panorama featuring Mont Blanc, Grandes Jorasses and Grand Combin.

Route (walking)

There is no marked path all the way to the top, but nevertheless, it is quite an easy and worthwhile ascent. Starting from La Pierre Alp ( above the entrance to the Great St-Bernard Tunnel, on the right side of the road), the southern peak can be reached in about three3 hours by an easy walk with a few metres of very easy climbing during the final ascent to the peak. The walking path marked by a red line (white background) leads in parallel to the stream, up to the grassy, mildly inclined plateau of Combe de Drône, from which Col du Bastillon can be reached. From here, the route is not signposted any more, but the peak can be reached relatively easily, by heading towards the abandoned bunker slits, then climbing up on the right hand side on the ledge above them. From this point, it becomes a normal walk again, on easily manageable rocky terrain, all the way up to the southern peak with its imposing panorama.

References

External links
 Monts Telliers on Hikr

Mountains of the Alps
Mountains of Switzerland
Mountains of Valais
Two-thousanders of Switzerland